Newark is a small city in New Castle County, Delaware, United States. According to the 2010 Census, the population of the city is 31,454. Newark is home to the University of Delaware.

History 
Newark was founded by Scots-Irish and Welsh settlers in 1694. The town was officially established when it received a charter from George II of Great Britain in 1758.

Schools have played a significant role in the history of Newark. A grammar school, founded by Francis Alison in 1743, moved from New London, Pennsylvania to Newark in 1765, becoming the Newark Academy. Among the first graduates of the school were three signers of the Declaration of Independence: George Read, Thomas McKean, and James Smith. Two of these, Read and McKean, went on to have schools named after them in the state of Delaware: George Read Middle School and Thomas McKean High School.

During the American Revolutionary War, British and American forces clashed outside Newark at the Battle of Cooch's Bridge. Tradition holds that the Battle of Cooch's Bridge was the first instance of the Stars and Stripes being flown in battle.

The state granted a charter to a new school in 1833, which was called Newark College. Newark Academy and Newark College joined together in the following year, becoming Delaware College. The school was forced to close in 1859, but was resuscitated eleven years later under the Morrill Act when it became a joint venture between the State of Delaware and the school's Board of Trustees. In 1913, pursuant to legislative Act, Delaware College came into sole ownership of the State of Delaware. The school would be renamed the University of Delaware in 1921.

Newark received a license from King George II to hold semi-annual fairs and weekly markets for agricultural exchange in 1758. A paper mill, the first sizable industrial venture in Newark, was created around 1798. This mill, eventually known as the Curtis Paper Mill, was the oldest paper mill in the United States until its closing in 1997. Methodists built the first church in 1812 and the railroad arrived in 1837.

One of Newark's major sources of employment and revenue was the Chrysler Newark Assembly plant which was built in 1951. Jamaican reggae star, Bob Marley worked as an assembly-line worker at the plant during his short stint in Delaware in the 1960s. Originally constructed to build tanks for the US Army, the plant was 3.4 million square feet in size. It employed 1,100 employees in 2008 which was down from 2,115 in 2005. This turn was due largely to the decline of sales of the Durango and Aspen vehicle models that were being produced. The plant stood for more than 50 years, providing jobs and revenue to the state of Delaware. The factory produced a wide variety of automobile models during its run. The plant was closed in late 2008 due to the recession and limited demand for larger cars.

Geography
Newark is located at  (39.6837226, −75.7496572). It is located directly east of the Maryland state line, adjacent to the unincorporated community of Fair Hill, and is less than one mile south of the tripoint where Delaware, Maryland, and Pennsylvania meet, known as The Wedge.

Originally surrounded by farmland, Newark is now surrounded by housing developments in some directions, although farmland remains just over the state lines in Maryland and Pennsylvania. To the north and west are small hills, but south and east of the city, the land is flat (part of Newark falls in the Piedmont geological region and part of the city is in the Coastal Plain geological region, as is the majority of the land in the State of Delaware).

Parks and natural areas
To the south is Iron Hill Park (part of the New Castle County Park System), to the west (in Cecil County, Maryland) is Fair Hill Natural Resources Management Area, and to the North is White Clay Creek State Park and White Clay Creek Preserve (in Chester County, Pennsylvania). Also nearby is Middle Run Valley Natural Area, which is part of the New Castle County Park System. These parks provide ample hiking, mountain biking, and horseback riding opportunities. The Fair Hill Natural Resources Management Area and large portions of White Clay Creek State Park consist of land formerly owned by the Du Pont family that was later ceded to the states of Maryland and Delaware, respectively.

Climate
According to the Köppen Climate Classification system, Newark has a humid subtropical climate (abbreviated Cfa on climate maps). Winters are moderate-to-cold, with snow common in December, January and February. Summers are hot and humid, with frequent afternoon thunderstorms. The hardiness zone is 7a.

Demographics

As of the census of 2000, there were 28,547 people, 8,989 households, and 4,494 families residing in the city. The racial makeup of the city was 87.29% White, 6.00% Black, 0.16% Native American, 4.07% Asian, 0.05% Pacific Islander, 0.86% from other races, and 1.57% from two or more races. Hispanic or Latino of any race were 2.53% of the population. 16.8% were of Irish, 13.5% Italian, 13.4% German, 10.2% English and 5.1% Polish ancestry according to Census 2000.

Of the 8,989 households, 20.7% had children under the age of 18 living with them, 40.5% were married couples living together, 7.2% had a female householder with no husband present, and 50.0% were non-families. 27.2% of all households were made up of individuals, and 9.3% had someone living alone who was 65 years of age or older. The average household size was 2.43 and the average family size was 2.91.

In the city, the population was spread out, with 12.5% under the age of 18, 43.6% from 18 to 24, 19.8% from 25 to 44, 14.9% from 45 to 64, and 9.1% who were 65 years of age or older. The median age was 23 years. For every 100 females, there were 85.2 males. For every 100 females age 18 and over, there were 82.3 males.

The median household income was $48,758, and the median family income was $75,188. Males had a median income of $45,813 versus $33,165 for females. The per capita income for the city was $20,376. About 4.1% of families and 20.1% of the population were below the poverty line, including 7.0% of those under age 18 and 7.1% of those age 65 or over.

Education

Public schools
Public education in Newark is managed by the Christina School District and, for regional vocational schools, the New Castle County Vocational-Technical School District. The Christina School District manages public education for Newark and environs, and also for parts of Wilmington.

Christina School District elementary schools (K-5) serving portions of the city limits include:
Downes Elementary School
Maclary Elementary School
McVey Elementary School
West Park Place Elementary School
Brookside Elementary School (in nearby Brookside)

Other schools with Newark addresses:
Gallaher Elementary School (grades K-5)
Jennie E. Smith Elementary School (grades K-5)

Shue/Medill Middle School, in an unincorporated area, serves most of the Newark city limits while small parts are zoned to Gauger-Cobbs Middle School in Brookside. George Kirk Middle School, also in Brookside, previously served sections.

Newark High School serves almost all of the city limits, with small portions in the south zoned to Glasgow High School. Christiana High School (grades 9-12) has a Newark postal address but does not, as of 2008, serve any of the Newark city limits.

Delaware School for the Deaf (grades K-12), operated by the State of Delaware, is in nearby Brookside.

Newark Charter School is a state-chartered school offering grades K-12.

History of education
Until 1884 Newark's public education system was grades 1-8 only, with Wilmington having the nearest public high school, and with the private Newark Academy being the private option. The Old Newark Comprehensive School served as the first public high school for Newark.

University of Delaware

Newark is home to the University of Delaware (UD). The school has programs in a broad range of subjects, but is probably best known for its business, chemical engineering, chemistry and biochemistry programs, drawing from the historically strong presence of the nation's chemical and pharmaceutical industries in the state of Delaware. In 2006, UD's graduate engineering program was ranked number 11 in the nation by The Princeton Review. Newark's Main Street is popular among both the University of Delaware students as well as the residents of Newark, offering many restaurant and boutique options.

Sports
Newark is a recognized center of US and international figure skating, mostly due to the many national, world, and Olympic champions (including many foreign nationals) that have trained at the University of Delaware Figure Skating Club (an independent club operating within UD facilities) and at The Pond Ice Rink. In 2009, Sporting News ranked Newark 192 in its list of the 400 Best Sports Cities.

The University of Delaware offers 21 varsity sports, which compete in the NCAA Division I. The athletic teams at Delaware are known as the Fightin' Blue Hens, named after the Blue Hen of Delaware, the state bird of Delaware. The official mascot of the University of Delaware is YouDee.

The Delaware 87ers were a professional basketball team that played in the NBA G League (formerly the NBA D-League) as the affiliate of the Philadelphia 76ers. From 2013 until 2018, they played their home games at the Bob Carpenter Center in Newark on the University of Delaware campus. They moved to nearby Wilmington and the 76ers' new Fieldhouse, rebranded as the Delaware Blue Coats.

As of 2022, it is also serves as the headquarters of Combat Zone Wrestling.

Infrastructure

Transportation

Several highways pass through the Newark area. Interstate 95, the main interstate highway through the northeast urban seaboard corridor, passes to the south of Newark on the tolled Delaware Turnpike. Delaware Route 896 serves as the main north-south route through the Newark area, interchanging with I-95 to the south and continuing north through the city, bypassing the University of Delaware campus to the west. Delaware Route 72 runs north-south, bypassing Newark to the east. Major east–west highways through the Newark area include Delaware Route 273, which passes through the heart of Newark, Delaware Route 2, which heads east to Wilmington, Delaware Route 4, which bypasses Newark to the south on the Christiana Parkway, and Delaware Route 279, which heads southwest towards Elkton, Maryland.

The City of Newark Parking Division regulates parking in the downtown area of Newark with 457 on-street parking meters, three off-street hourly parking lots offering a total of 577 spaces, and two long-term monthly parking lots offering a total of 151 spaces. The city regulates parking in residential areas of Newark with residential parking permits. The University of Delaware regulates parking at various lots and garages on-campus.

The closest airport to Newark is the Wilmington Airport in New Castle County. The closest airport to Newark that provides full domestic and international service is Philadelphia International Airport.

Newark has a Rail Station (Map, via Google Maps) located to the south of downtown near the University of Delaware campus that is serviced by both SEPTA and Amtrak on the Northeast Corridor. Newark is the last stop on the SEPTA Wilmington/Newark Line, one of the farthest points out on the system. SEPTA service to Newark consists of a few trains in both directions during the morning and evening rush hours on weekdays only. There is limited Amtrak service in Newark with one train in each direction on weekdays, an additional northbound train on Thursdays and Fridays and an additional southbound train on Fridays, and three trains in each direction on weekends. Newark is also served by two freight railroads. Norfolk Southern provides freight service via trackage rights on the Northeast Corridor line and the Delmarva Secondary line that splits to the south to run toward the Delmarva Peninsula and an interchange with the Delmarva Central Railroad in Porter. Norfolk Southern operates the Newark Yard adjacent to the former Newark Assembly plant used by Chrysler that is now owned by the University of Delaware. CSX passes through the northern part of Newark along the Philadelphia Subdivision line.

Newark is served by DART First State bus routes No. 6, 10, 33, 42, 46, 53, 55, and 302 and Cecil Transit bus route No. 4, providing service to Wilmington, the Christiana Mall, Elkton, MD, and Dover. Most routes travel through the university campus and also stop at the rail station. The Newark Transit Hub is located in the eastern part of the town and serves several of the bus routes. There is also a UNICITY bus, run jointly through the city and the University of Delaware, free for everyone to ride, which acts as a community circulator. Unicity operates one route Monday through Friday except major holidays and when city and university offices are closed. The University of Delaware also operates the UD Shuttle bus system, available and free to all students and those associated with the university. OurBus provides intercity bus service from Newark to New York City and Washington, D.C., stopping at a park and ride lot at the intersection of DE 4 and DE 896. Megabus and OurBus provide intercity bus service from Newark to New York City, Baltimore, and Washington, D.C.. The Megabus stop is located at the University of Delaware campus. The OurBus stop is located at the Route 896 & Route 4 Park and Ride.

Utilities

The City of Newark Electric Department provides electricity within the city limits. The city's electric department purchases electricity on the wholesale market, serving about 12,800 customers and maintaining  of electric lines. The electric department is a member of the Delaware Municipal Electric Corporation. The City of Newark Public Works and Water Resources Department provides trash collection, recycling, water, and wastewater service to Newark. The city's water supply comes from the Newark Reservoir. The city maintains  of sewer lines, with wastewater pumped through the New Castle County system to the Wilmington Regional Wastewater Treatment facility. Natural gas service in Newark is provided by Delmarva Power, a subsidiary of Exelon.

Health care
Christiana Care Health System operates the Christiana Hospital to the east of Newark. The hospital has 907 beds, 22 hospital operating rooms, 10 outpatient operating rooms, an emergency room with the only Level I trauma center in Delaware, the state's only Level 3 neonatal intensive care unit, the state's largest maternity center, the Center for Heart & Vascular Health, and the Helen F. Graham Cancer Center.

Notable people

Joe Biden (born 1942), former U.S. Senator; 47th Vice President of the United States, 46th President of the United States
Tarzan Cooper (1907–1980), professional basketball player
Harry Coover (1917–2011), inventor
Dave Douglas, golfer
Tom Douglas, award-winning Seattle chef
Joe Flacco, former University of Delaware football player; current New York Jets quarterback
Anthony Fontana, professional footballer; current midfielder for the Philadelphia Union
David Grinnage, former North Carolina State University football player; former NFL tight end for the Jacksonville Jaguars
Wilbert L. Gore, chemical engineer and founder of W. L. Gore & Associates
Orien Harris, former University of Miami football player; former NFL defensive end
Richard Howell, former governor of New Jersey
K. C. Keeler, former University of Delaware football coach
Chad Kuhl, Major League Baseball pitcher for the Pittsburgh Pirates
Jack Markell, former governor of Delaware
M. A. Muqtedar Khan, Muslim American intellectual and commentator
Bilal Nichols, former University of Delaware football player; current Chicago Bears defensive end
Harold "Tubby" Raymond, College Hall of Fame football coach
George Thorogood, rock and roll musician
Johnny Weir, U.S. figure skating champion
Madinah Wilson-Anton, candidate for the Delaware House of Representatives
Vic Willis, Hall of Fame baseball player

Media

Radio 
 WVUD/91.3: University of Delaware

Magazine 
 Newark Life Magazine

Newspaper
 Newark Post

Notes

References

External links

 
 Brief History of Newark
 A History of Newark, from 1757 to 1888 from Thomans J. Scharf's Chapter on White Clay Creek Hundred in History of Delaware, 1609–1888.
 Official Delaware Tourism Website's list of Newark Attractions 

 
Populated places established in 1694
Cities in New Castle County, Delaware
Cities in Delaware
1694 establishments in Delaware